Soltaniyeh castle is a historical castle located in Soltaniyeh County in Zanjan Province, The longevity of this fortress dates back to the 1st millennium BC.

References 

Castles in Iran